Rythu Bandhu scheme also Farmer's Investment Support Scheme (FISS) is a welfare program to support farmer’s investment for two crops a year by the Government of Telangana. The government is providing 58.33 lakh (5.8 million) farmers ₹5000 per acre per season to support the farm investment, twice a year, for rabi(Yasangi) and kharif(Rainy) seasons. This is a first direct farmer investment support scheme in India, where the cash is paid directly.

History
The scheme was announced by the Chief Minister of Telangana, K. Chandrashekhar Rao at Farmers Coordination Committee (Rythu Samanvaya Samithi) conference at Jayashankar Agriculture University on 25 February 2018. An allocation of ₹12,000 crores was made in 2018-19 state budget. It was launched on 10 May 2018 at Dharmarajpalli village in Karimnagar. If a farmer has a lot of field such that they are due more than Rs.49,000 then they get a second check for the remaining amount.

The scheme
The scheme offers a financial help of ₹10,000 per year to each farmer (two crops). There is no cap on the number of acres, and most of the farmers are small and marginal. The total farming land is 1.43 crore acres and the number of farmers in the state stood at 58.33 lakh. Around 55% of population in Telangana make a living from agriculture.

The agriculture land holdings are:

Land ceiling & Tenancy
As per AP Land Ceiling Act 1976, any person cannot hold more than 51 acres agriculture land and 21 acres dryland. Tenant farmers were excluded from the scheme to prevent legal disputes arising out of tenancy (Hyderabad Tenancy and Agricultural Lands Act, 1950). To prevent legal disputes, the tenancy column was removed from the newly issued Pattadar Passbook.

Give it Up! Option
The Chief Minister was the first farmer to forgo the support called as, Give it up!, given by the government and appealed to all rich farmers to do the same. The farmers who forgo the support, the money goes to the corpus of Rythu Samanvaya Samithi corpus.

Distribution
The money is given to the farmers through a bank bearer cheque. The Agriculture Extension Officers (AEO) will supervise the Rythu Bandhu cheques distribution at village level. They make entries cheque details on a tablet computer provided to them for easy monitoring.

New Pattadar Passbook
Along with the cheque, the government is also giving the new Pattadar Passbook, the title deed after an exercise to purify the land records was done by the government. The new passbook is highly secure with 17 tamper-proof security features, and a land bank website, Dharani, to have all land holdings in the state.

Monitoring
A special dashboard software is being developed by the NIC to monitor the scheme remotely. The sample for the research is selected through random sampling.

Misuse 
The scheme pays all land owners regardless of their personal income and wealth. Much of the opposition to the scheme is directed towards payments to rich land owners. Many wealthy individuals such as government officials, doctors and businessmen etc. are known to own large tracts of farmlands. In contrary to the scheme's intention all such individuals are paid the scheme benefits. According to the government's estimates about 319 crores is paid annually to farmers who own more than 20 acers. However the estimate doesn't take in to consideration the practice of splitting the land between members of the same family in order to show smaller land holding.In addition, the scheme only pays the land owners and not the tillers.
 
Oftentimes rich land owners lease their lands to poor farmers for cultivation. In recent times the practice of land leasing is increasing substantially due to scarcity of farm labor. Rich land owners unwilling to do the hard work are leasing their lands to hardworking poor tillers. However, the tillers don't get any benefit from the scheme, defeating its purpose. Besides, the scheme is known to pay for lands that are not in cultivation such as lands converted for real estate or other commercial purposes. 
The political opposition often criticized the state government for its failure to curb the misuse of the scheme.

Annadatha Sukhibhava

Annadatha Sukhibhava (అన్నదాత సుఖీభవ ) is a welfare program started by Andhra Pradesh Government to provide ₹15,000 investment support to small and marginal farmer’s family per annum which includes ₹6000 Central Government Pradhan Mantri Kisan Samman Nidhi share. The government is providing support to nearly 70 lakh farmers including tenant farmers. This farmer investment support scheme where the cash is paid directly into the Aadhaar linked bank accounts will cover all the farmers in the state on Family as unit basis without any conditions. It was formally started on 19-02-2019 by providing ₹1000 Initially by RTGS Center.

MIT study
MIT’s Abdul Latif Jameel Poverty Action Lab (J-PAL), a poverty alleviation institute. It is conducting the study for randomly selected sample and is using High-frequency monitoring in-Person Phone Survey and IVR based survey on the effectiveness of the scheme. A 40-member team of professors is carrying out the calls.

References

Government schemes in Telangana
KCR Government initiatives